Title 31 of the United States Code outlines the role of the money and finance in the United States Code.

Legislative history 

The title was codified September 13, 1982 as "Money and Finance", .

Contents 

Subtitle I:  General 
 : Definitions
 : Department of the Treasury
 : Office of Management and Budget
 : Government Accountability Office
 : Agency Chief Financial Officers

Subtitle II:  The Budget Process 
 : The Budget and Fiscal, Budget, and Program Information
 : Appropriations
 : Appropriation Accounting

Subtitle III:  Financial Management 
 : Public Debt
 : Depositing, Keeping, and Paying Money
 : Accounting and Collecting
 : Claims
 : Administrative Remedies for False Claims and Statements
 : Prompt Payment

Subtitle IV:  Money 
 : Coins and Currency
 : Denominations, specifications, and design of coin
 :  Sacagawea dollar
 :  American Silver Eagle
 :  50 State Quarters
 :  Presidential $1 Coin Program
 :  Presidential $1 Coin Program#First Spouse Program
 : Monetary Transactions

Subtitle V:  General Assistance Administration 
 : Program Information
 : Consolidated Federal Funds Report
 : Using Procurement Contracts and Grant and Cooperative Agreements
 : Intergovernmental Cooperation
 : Federal Payments
 : Payment for Entitlement Land
 : Joint Funding Simplification
 : Administering Block Grants
 : Requirements for Single Audits
 : Access to Information for Debt Collection

Subtitle VI:  Miscellaneous 
 : Government Corporations
 : Sureties and Surety Bonds
 : Government Pension Plan Protection
 : Miscellaneous

References

External links
 U.S. Code Title 31, via United States Government Printing Office
 U.S. Code Title 31, via Cornell University

31